Calbraith Perry Rodgers (January 12, 1879 – April 3, 1912) was an American aviation pioneer. He made the first transcontinental airplane flight across the U.S. from September 17, 1911, to November 5, 1911, with dozens of stops, both intentional and accidental. The feat made him a national celebrity, but he was killed in a crash a few months later  at an exhibition in California.

Early life
Rodgers was born on January 12, 1879, in Pittsburgh, Pennsylvania, to Calbraith Perry Rodgers and Maria Chambers Rodgers. His father, an Army captain, died on August 23, 1878 prior to his birth. Among his ancestors, Rodgers had Commodores John Rodgers, who was his paternal grandfather, Oliver Hazard Perry, his maternal great-grandfather, and Matthew Calbraith Perry, his great-grand uncle. He was a cousin to John Rodgers, a naval aviation pioneer known for setting the record of longest non-stop flight by seaplane of 1992 miles (3206 km) on an attempt to fly from San Francisco to Honolulu in 1925.

In 1885, Rodgers contracted scarlet fever, which left him deaf in one ear and hearing impaired in the other, which effectively barred him from following the family tradition of naval service. He received his education first at home and then at the Mercersburg Academy. In 1902, Rodgers joined his mother and sister in New York City. He became a member of the New York Yacht Club, and besides boating he rode motorcycles and drove cars. In 1906 he married Mabel Avis Graves; they had no children. The Rodgers resided in Havre de Grace, Maryland.

Aviation
In June 1911, Rodgers visited his cousin John, a naval aviator, who since March was studying at the Wright Company factory and attending flying school in Dayton, Ohio. Rodgers became interested in aviation. He received 90 minutes of flying lessons from Orville Wright, and purchased a Wright Flyer with John. On August 7, 1911, he took his official flying examination at Huffman Prairie and became the 49th aviator licensed to fly by the Fédération Aéronautique Internationale. He was one of the first civilians to purchase an airplane.

Instead of flying home, Rodgers entered the 1911 Chicago International Aviation Meet, where he competed with the leading aviators of the time. He set several records, including the duration record, and won $11,285 in prize money.

Cross-country flight
On October 10, 1910, publisher William Randolph Hearst offered the Hearst prize, US$50,000 to the first aviator to fly coast to coast, in either direction, in less than 30 days from start to finish. Rodgers persuaded J. Ogden Armour, of Armour and Company, to sponsor the flight, and in return he named the plane, a Wright Model EX, after Armour's grape soft drink Vin Fiz. A special train of three cars, including sleeper, diner, and shop-on-wheels full of spare parts, was assembled to follow Rodgers, who planned to fly above the railroad tracks.

Rodgers left from Sheepshead Bay, New York, on September 17, 1911, at 4:30 pm. He reached Chicago, the only required stop, on October 8, 1911. His arrival to Chicago attracted national attention.

To avoid the Rocky Mountains, he took a southerly route, flying through the Midwest until reaching Texas. He turned west after passing San Antonio. On November 5, 1911, he landed at Tournament Park in Pasadena, California, at 4:04 pm in front of 20,000 people, missing the prize deadline by 19 days. He left Pasadena on November 12, but crashed at Compton. After the Vin Fiz was repaired, on December 10, 1911, he reached Long Beach, California, flew some time above the Pacific Ocean, landed on a beach and taxied the plane into the ocean. About 50,000 people came to witness the completion of the first transcontinental east–west flight.

Rodgers had carried the first transcontinental U.S. Mail pouch. The trip required 70 stops and endured countless crashes and aircraft malfunctions. (Rodgers paid $70 a week to the Wright brothers' technician, Charlie Taylor, who followed the Vin Fiz by train and performed necessary maintenance or repairs.) The next transcontinental flight was made by Robert G. Fowler.

Death

On April 3, 1912, while making an exhibition flight over Long Beach, California, he flew into a flock of birds, causing the plane to crash into the ocean. His neck was broken and his thorax damaged by the engine of the airplane. He died a few moments later, a few hundred feet from where the Vin Fiz ended its transcontinental flight. The aircraft in this last flight was the spare Model B he had carried in the special train during the transcontinental flight, rather than the Vin Fiz. The Vin Fiz itself was later given to the Smithsonian Institution by Calbraith's widow, Mabel Rodgers, and is now on display at the National Air and Space Museum. According to contemporary records, his was the 127th airplane fatality since aviation began, and he was the 22nd American aviator to die in an accident. He was also the first pilot who fatally crashed as a result of a bird strike.

Rodgers was interred at Allegheny Cemetery in his hometown of Pittsburgh.

Rodgers was posthumously inducted into the National Aviation Hall of Fame in 1964.

See also

Harry Nelson Atwood, who previously attempted a transcontinental flight
List of fatalities from aviation accidents

References

Further reading

Eileen F. Lebow, Cal Rodgers and the Vin Fiz: the First Transcontinental Flight (Washington, D.C.: Smithsonian Institution Press, 1989)
E. P. Stein, Flight of the Vin Fiz (New York: Arbor House, 1985) .
Richard L. Taylor, The First Flight Across the United States: the Story of Calbraith Perry Rodgers and His Airplane, the Vin Fiz, (New York: F. Watts, 1993)
Linn's Stamp News; January 14, 2002, p. 14; "New 'Vin Fiz Flyer' card found and auctioned"
The New York Times; Wednesday, October 11, 1911; Air Record Broken By Aviator Rodgers; Exceeds Atwood's Cross-Country Flight Of 1,265 Miles By Making 1,398 To Date. Marshall, Missouri, October 10, 1911. C.P. Rodgers, the aviator who is trying to make a coast to coast flight, landed at Marshall at 4:23 o'clock this afternoon, exceeding the world's record for cross country aeroplane flight by 133 miles. The world' record of 1,265 miles was made by Henry Atwood in a recent flight from St. Louis to New York. Rodgers has flown 1,398 miles according to railroad mileage.

External links

Calbraith Rodgers bibliography
Early Aviators: Calbraith Rodgers
Smithsonian: Vin Fiz
The Epic Flight of the Vin Fiz Flyer

Calbraith Rodgers background and details regarding his 1911, Vin Fiz flight

1879 births
1912 deaths
Perry family
Aviators from Pennsylvania
Aviators killed in aviation accidents or incidents in the United States
Accidental deaths in California
People from Pittsburgh
People from Havre de Grace, Maryland
Burials at Allegheny Cemetery
Victims of aviation accidents or incidents in 1912
Rodgers family